John Hubbard (April 14, 1914 – November 6, 1988) was an American television and film actor.

Career
MGM changed Hubbard's professional name to Anthony Allen and cast him in modest feature films and short subjects for one year.

In 1939, Hal Roach signed John Hubbard (under his given name) as one of five promising young actors with "star" potential (the other four were Lon Chaney, Jr., Victor Mature, Carole Landis, and William Bendix). Roach saw something in Hubbard, whose handsome features lent themselves to romantic roles while his dialogue skills allowed him to play farce comedy. He was showcased in The Housekeeper's Daughter (1939) and Turnabout (1940), but when Roach abandoned full-length features for shorter featurettes, Hubbard found roles elsewhere.

During World War II Hubbard was busily engaged as a "male lead for hire" at several studios, substituting for established male stars who had joined the armed forces. With no single studio guiding his career, Hubbard never advanced to important roles in major productions, and wound up in roles in romances, mysteries, and musical comedies produced on lower budget. Hubbard himself joined the military in 1944, and resumed his movie career in 1947 at smaller, independent studios.

Television
Hubbard found additional opportunities in the new field of television, as a supporting actor. He played "Brown" in The Mickey Rooney Show (12 episodes), "Bill Bronson" in My Little Margie (four episodes), "Col. U. Charles Barker" in the military comedy Don't Call Me Charlie! (18 episodes) and "Ted Gaynor" in Family Affair (eight episodes). However, most of his television assignments were single appearances in popular network series like Perry Mason, The Green Hornet, and Adam-12. He was frequently cast by Warner Bros. for such series as Maverick, Hawaiian Eye, 77 Sunset Strip, Lawman, Cheyenne, and Surfside 6.

Other media
In 1951 Hubbard starred on stage with Mary Brian in a comedy, Mary Had a Little, in Melbourne, Australia. Hubbard also worked in network radio, replacing Robert North as Alice Faye's brother Willy starting in the 1953–54 season of The Phil Harris-Alice Faye Show. Between acting roles, Hubbard worked as an automobile salesman and the manager of a restaurant. He retired from acting in 1974 after a character role in Herbie Rides Again, although he made one more appearance in a television movie in 1980.

Personal life and death
Hubbard was married to his high school sweetheart, Lois, for nearly 50 years. The couple had three children: Lois, Jane, and John. On November 6, 1988, Hubbard died at the age of 74 in a convalescent home in Camarillo, California.

Filmography

Notes

External links

1914 births
1988 deaths
Male actors from Indiana
American male film actors
American military personnel of World War II
American male television actors
20th-century American male actors
People from East Chicago, Indiana
Metro-Goldwyn-Mayer contract players
Hal Roach Studios actors